Konstantin Safronov (born 2 September 1987) is a Kazakhstani athlete specialising in the long jump. He represented his country at two world championships, in 2009 and 2013, without qualifying for the final.

He has personal bests of 8.10 metres outdoors (Almaty 2013) and 7.93 metres indoors (Karaganda 2006).

He is the husband of Olga Safronova (née Bludova), a Kazakhstani sprinter.

Competition record

References

1987 births
Living people
Kazakhstani male long jumpers
Athletes (track and field) at the 2006 Asian Games
Athletes (track and field) at the 2010 Asian Games
Athletes (track and field) at the 2014 Asian Games
Kazakhstani people of Russian descent
Asian Games competitors for Kazakhstan